Xiurenbagrus gigas is a species of catfish of the family Amblycipitidae. For a detailed description of the species (including references), see the article Xiurenbagrus.

Amblycipitidae
Endemic fauna of China
Fish of China
Fish described in 2004